Kaveri Palam is a bridge in Tiruchirapalli, Tamil Nadu, India.

References

Kaveri River
Bridges in Tamil Nadu
Buildings and structures in Tiruchirappalli
Year of establishment missing